Southern Command can refer to a number of military commands:

Southern Command (IRA)
Southern Command (Israel)
Southern Command (India)
Southern Command (United Kingdom)
United States Southern Command
Southern Command (video game)
Southern Command (Syrian rebel group)